Mihovil Pavlek – Miškina (1887, Đelekovec, Kingdom of Croatia-Slavonia – 1942, Jasenovac, Independent State of Croatia) was a Croatian poet, short story writer and politician. He was a member of the Croatian Peasant Party and an opponent of the Ustaša regime.

His work usually embraced Socialist ideas and protested against injustice. The pseudonym "Miškina" was adopted later when he started participating in some literary activities of Yugoslavia, and labeled a "peasant writer" some time after. He supported the election of Ivica Hiršl for Mayor of Koprivnica. He was executed at the Jasenovac concentration camp in 1942.

Today, there are elementary schools in Zagreb and Đelekovec named after Pavlek Miškina.

Sources

References
"Opća enciklopedija", Zagreb, 1980.
"Mala enciklopedija Prosveta", Belgrade, 1978.
Miškina: "Trakavica", Zagreb, 1946.
Šime Vučetić: "Mihovil Pavlek Miškina" u 115. knjizi edicije "Pet stoljeća hrvatske književnosti", Zagreb, 1985.
Jovan Nedić: "Pavlek", "Skandifeniks", ..., 277, 16 - Rijeka, 2004

Citations

Further reading
 

1887 births
1942 deaths
People from Đelekovec
Croatian male poets
Croatian people of World War II
Executed writers
20th-century Croatian poets
People who died in Jasenovac concentration camp
20th-century male writers
Yugoslav poets